Events from the year 1896 in Russia.

Incumbents
 Monarch – Nicholas II

Events

 1896 World Figure Skating Championships
 All-Russia Exhibition 1896
 Khodynka Tragedy
 Ādolfs Alunāns Theatre

Births
 Lev Vygotsky.
 Leon Theremin (Lev Sergeyevich Termen)

Deaths

 13 October – Alexander Theodorowicz Batalin,  botanist (b. 1847)

References

1896 in Russia
Years of the 19th century in the Russian Empire